Marvin Maietti (born 2 February 1993) is an Italian footballer who plays as a midfielder for Italian Serie D club Scanzorosciate.

Club career
Born in Crema, Lombardy region, Maietti started his career at Lombard club A.C. Milan. In 2011, he was signed by another Lombard club AlbinoLeffe along with Simone Pontiggia and Matteo Doni. Maietti was a player in the reserve team in 2011–12 season, which the first team relegated from Serie B in 2012.

The club failed to win the promotion playoffs in 2014. In the playoffs Cremonese won the game by penalty shootout in 6–5. Maietti did not take part in the shootout as the 10th assigned player.

References

External links
 AIC profile (data by football.it) 

1993 births
People from Crema, Lombardy
Footballers from Lombardy
Living people
Italian footballers
Association football midfielders
A.C. Milan players
U.C. AlbinoLeffe players
U.S. Pergolettese 1932 players
Serie C players
Serie D players
Sportspeople from the Province of Cremona